Gereb Segen may refer to:
 Gereb Segen (May Gabat)
 Gereb Segen (Hintalo)